Napoleone Ferrara (born 26 July 1956, Catania), is an Italian-American molecular biologist who joined University of California, San Diego Moores Cancer Center in 2013 after a career in Northern California at the biotechnology giant Genentech, where he pioneered the development of new treatments for angiogenic diseases such as cancer, age-related macular degeneration (AMD), and diabetic retinopathy. At Genentech, he discovered VEGF—and made the first anti-VEGF antibody—which suppresses growth of a variety of tumors. These findings helped lead to development of the first clinically available angiogenesis inhibitor, bevacizumab (Avastin), which prevents the growth of new blood vessels into a solid tumor and which has become part of standard treatment for a variety of cancers. Ferrara's work led also to the development of ranibizumab (Lucentis), a drug that is highly effective at preventing vision loss in intraocular neovascular disorders.

Education
Ferrara received his medical degree from the University of Catania, Italy, in 1981, and joined Genentech in 1988. He did his postdoctoral research at University of California, San Francisco.

Current research
At UC San Diego Moores Cancer Center, Ferrara, a member of the National Academy of Sciences since 2006, serves as Senior Deputy Director for Basic Science and is a Distinguished Professor of Pathology in the UC San Diego School of Medicine, where he will continue cancer drug research targeting angiogenesis. He is presently focusing on investigating mechanisms of tumor angiogenesis alternative to VEGF, in particular the role of factors produced by myeloid cells and fibroblasts in mediating resistance to VEGF inhibitors.

Selected honors and awards
For his VEGF discovery, he won a Lasker Award in 2010. In 2013, he was awarded the $3 million Breakthrough Prize in Life Sciences for his work. He has received numerous other awards, including the General Motors Cancer Research Award (2006), the ASCO Science of Oncology Award (2007), the Pezcoller Foundation/AACR International Award (2009), the Dr. Paul Janssen Award for Biomedical Research (2011), and The Economist's Innovation Award for bioscience in 2012. Grand Prix scientifique de la Fondation Lefoulon-Delalande in 2005.

In September 2014, Ferrara was awarded the António Champalimaud Vision Award, awarded by the Champalimaud Foundation.

References

1956 births
Living people
Italian molecular biologists
Genentech people
University of California, San Diego faculty
Winners of The Economist innovation awards
Recipients of the Lasker-DeBakey Clinical Medical Research Award
University of California, San Francisco alumni
Scientists from Sicily
Members of the National Academy of Medicine